John Nathaniel Ross (17 May 1920 – 24 December 2011) was an Irish Fine Gael politician and lawyer who served as a Senator for the Dublin University from 1961 to 1965.

He was originally from County Cork and married Ruth Isabel Cherrington. He was elected to Seanad Éireann as an Independent member in 1961, by the Dublin University constituency. He subsequently sat as a Fine Gael member. He lost his seat at the 1965 election.

His son Shane Ross, is a former Senator for Dublin University, was a TD for Dublin Rathdown from 2011 to 2020 and Minister for Transport, Tourism and Sport.

See also
Families in the Oireachtas

References

1920 births
2011 deaths
Independent members of Seanad Éireann
Members of the 10th Seanad
Alumni of Trinity College Dublin
Politicians from County Cork
Irish solicitors
Members of Seanad Éireann for Dublin University